Magnaosimum is a genus of trematodes in the family Opecoelidae. It consists of one species, Magnaosimum brooksae Martin, Crouch, Cutmore & Cribb, 2018.

References

Opecoelidae
Plagiorchiida genera
Monotypic protostome genera